Slap Happy Lion is a 1947 American animated short film directed by Tex Avery and produced by Fred Quimby for Metro-Goldwyn-Mayer. Released on September 20, 1947, the short details the tragic downfall of a lion from king of the beasts to a gibbering, pill-popping wreck. It is narrated by a mouse whose torments drove him crazy. The mouse's voice was supplied by Frank Graham. Scott Bradley provided the music.

The closing title in the re-issued version does not display the regular MGM card, and erroneously uses the Tom and Jerry card instead. This might indicate that MGM made a mistake when reissuing it. Also, the Tom and Jerry short Smarty Cat also does not display the ending card, using the regular MGM card instead.

The lion's design served as the inspiration for the design of Genghis, a character from The Wacky World of Tex Avery.

Plot
Outside the Jingling Bros. Circus (a parody of the Ringling Bros. Circus), a hospital ward clerk hauls out the lion in a wheelchair who has had a nervous breakdown. Watching this, a mouse expresses his disappointment about the lion being "mouse shocked" and then tells about what happened before.

We are then given a flashback about the lion being king of the beasts, because all the animals are scared to death of the lion, who roars and gets everyone out of his sight. His loud roar frightens every last animal, including a gorilla who screams, shrinks down in size, and runs off. Then one day, the lion meets a mouse, who says "Boo" and makes the lion double take and feel scared and scream two times at him. He hides up a tree, feels frightened, and comes down from the tree, but stands up, and roars at the mouse, who unfortunately proves to be tougher than him, and eventually walks away, but mistakenly steps into the wrong direction by going into the lion's mouth.

The lion succeeds in catching the mouse, and tries to eat him to hopefully kill him, but is so distracted of trying to do so, that he doesn't realize in the next moment, that when he fails to notice that he is missing a tooth, which fell out of his mouth from a gum between the rest of his teeth, that the mouse is hiding in after he inadvertently walks into the wrong direction into the lion's mouth, it is too late for the lion to see his missing tooth. The mouse then gets out of the lion's mouth and rolls out his tongue like a window shade. The lion grabs the mouse with his tongue, and pulls him in, and tries swallowing him while the mouse finds himself inside the stomach. As he finds two bones lying inside, the mouse plays the ribs inside the lion like an xylophone. The lion tries to kill the mouse by lighting a bomb with a match, putting it in his mouth, and swallowing it. When the mouse sees the bomb inside the lion's stomach and screams, he escapes the lion's mouth again and flees from him. The lion feels smug until he realizes the bomb is still inside him, which makes him scream for help, and blows up, but can't blow him up when he survives the explosion and gets his tail bitten by the mouse, who grabs and bites the lion's tail and angers him even more.

While the lion looks for the mouse, the mouse sneaks inside his head and then pulls out firecrackers, which blow up. The mouse cooks the lion's tail, causing him to roar in pain, and when he goes to the lake to cool it down, the mouse pulls out a safety pin to poke on his rear.

The lion then tries to hide from the mouse, but finds him in the following areas:

 On top of a palm tree
 Under a rock to hopefully dodge the mouse, only to find him in it
 In an abandoned hut
 In a gun that the lion fires to shoot the mouse
 In a bed where the mouth lives in
 In a reflection of the mirror
 In a bottle of whiskey, that he tries to drink

The mouse finally peeves the lion in different ways by hurting his feet, blowing a toot in his ears, biting his nose, and kicking him out, and when he is now a nervous wreck, the lion runs out of the hut and around the jungle.

After the story, the mouse wonders how anyone could be afraid of a mouse when another mouse shows up and says "Boo." and despite being a mouse himself, he says 'A mouse.' and screams and runs off like the lion did.

References

External links

1947 animated films
1947 short films
1947 films
1940s American animated films
1940s animated short films
Metro-Goldwyn-Mayer animated short films
Films directed by Tex Avery
Animated films about lions
Metro-Goldwyn-Mayer films
Films scored by Scott Bradley
Films with screenplays by Henry Wilson Allen
Films produced by Fred Quimby
Films set in jungles
Metro-Goldwyn-Mayer cartoon studio short films